Brandyn Thompson (born October 30, 1989) is a Canadian football cornerback for the Edmonton Eskimos of the Canadian Football League (CFL). He was drafted by the Washington Redskins in the seventh round of the 2011 NFL Draft. He played college football at Boise State.

Professional career

2011 NFL Combine

Washington Redskins

2011 season
Thompson was drafted by the Washington Redskins in the seventh round of the 2011 NFL Draft. Although he made the active 53-man roster at the start of the season, he was waived October 5, to make room for Phillip Buchanon after the latter's suspension ended. On October 6, 2011, Thompson was signed to the Redskins' practice squad. 
On November 5, 2011, Thompson was promoted back to the active roster after Buchanon was placed on injured reserve. 
He was waived again on November 8 and placed on the practice squad the next day. 
After the Redskins cut D.J. Johnson, Thompson was promoted back to active roster on November 30, 2011, to fill the roster spot.
At the end of the 2011 NFL season, his rookie season, Thompson played a total of six games and recorded two tackles.

2012 season
During the first OTA of the 2012 preseason, Thompson and Pierre Garçon accidentally collided into coach Mike Shanahan. Thompson was cut on August 31, 2012, for final cuts before the start of the 2012 season.

Toronto Argonauts
On March 8, 2013, Thompson was signed by the Toronto Argonauts of the Canadian Football League. He was released by the Argonauts on May 2, 2013.

Ottawa Redblacks
On April 23, 2014, Thompson signed a contract with the Ottawa Redblacks of the Canadian Football League. Thompson played two seasons with the Ottawa Redblacks, playing in 17 of the 18 regular season games both years. In his second year in the league Ottawa went all the way to the Grey Cup game where they were defeated by the Edmonton Eskimos. In his two years in Ottawa Thompson totaled 97 tackles, 7 interceptions and 1 forced fumble. Following the 2015 CFL season Thompson was not re-signed and became a free-agent on February 9, 2016.

Still a free-agent in mid-April Thompson was contemplating whether or not he had a future in professional football.

Personal
Thompson's great uncle John Thompson II coached the Georgetown Hoyas basketball team from 1972 to 1999.

References

External links
 
 Ottawa Redblacks profile 
 

1989 births
Living people
African-American players of American football
African-American players of Canadian football
American football cornerbacks
Boise State Broncos football players
Canadian football defensive backs
Edmonton Elks players
Ottawa Redblacks players
Players of American football from California
Sportspeople from Elk Grove, California
Toronto Argonauts players
Washington Redskins players
21st-century African-American sportspeople
20th-century African-American people